The Cabinet of Habib Saad was the fourth cabinet of the State of Greater Lebanon, headed by Habib Pacha Saad. It was formed on 10 August 1928 and served until 29 May 1929.

Composition

References 

1928 establishments in Asia
Cabinets of Lebanon
Cabinets established in 1928
Cabinets disestablished in 1929